The discography of Kate Rusby, an English folk singer, consists of nineteen solo albums, four albums as part of a duo or group, four extended plays (EPs), two video albums, thirteen singles, and six music videos.  Rusby's debut was Intuition, an album recorded in collaboration with five other female singers from Yorkshire, which was released on a small label in 1993.  Her breakthrough came with an eponymous album recorded with Kathryn Roberts, another of the singers featured on Intuition.  This album, which was named as the best of the year by Folk Roots magazine, was the first release on Pure Records, a label set up by Rusby's father on which all her subsequent solo recordings have been released.  Rusby and Roberts also formed the band the Equation in conjunction with the Lakeman Brothers, but Rusby left the group after their debut EP.  In 1996 she joined the all-female folk group the Poozies, with whom she released one EP and one full-length album.

In 1997 Rusby released her first solo album, Hourglass, and two years later followed it with Sleepless, which was nominated for the Mercury Music Prize.  Two years later, Little Lights became Rusby's first release to enter the Top 100 of the UK Albums Chart, peaking at number 75.  Her highest placing on this chart came with 2012's 20, which reached number 22.  In 2006 she provided guest vocals on the single "All Over Again" by Irish pop singer Ronan Keating, which reached number six on the UK Singles Chart.  Rusby has also made guest appearances on albums by artists such as Show of Hands, Battlefield Band, Roddy Woomble, Ella Edmondson and John McCusker.

Albums

Solo albums

Collaborative albums

Extended plays

Singles

Video albums

Music videos

Other appearances

Soundtracks

Compilation albums
Only otherwise unreleased material included on compilation albums is listed

Guest appearances

References
General

Specific

External links
Official website

Folk music discographies